Carl Blanchard Allen (June 25, 1920 – November 7, 2008) was an American football player who played at the tailback position on both offense and defense. He played college football for Oklahoma City in 1946 and 1947 and professional football for the Brooklyn Dodgers in 1948.

Early years
A native of Haskell, Oklahoma, he attended Magnolia High School in Arkansas.

College football and military service
Allen played one season of college football at Ouachita Baptist University before being called into military service during World War II. After the war, he played at the tailback position for Oklahoma City University and led the 1946 and 1947 Oklahoma City football teams to records of 10–1 and 7–3. Oklahoma City coach Bo Rowland called Allen "the greatest tailback I ever coached . . . the most underrated back in football today."

Professional football
In April 1948, he signed to play professional football in the All-America Football Conference (AAFC) for the New York Yankees. Four months later, the Yankees traded him to the Brooklyn Dodgers, also of the AAFC. He played for the Dodgers during their 1948 season, appearing in 13 games with two interceptions and one touchdown.

Later years
He died in 2008 at age 88.

References

1920 births
2008 deaths
Brooklyn Dodgers (AAFC) players
Oklahoma City Chiefs football players
Ouachita Baptist Tigers football players
Players of American football from Oklahoma
People from Haskell, Oklahoma